__notoc__

The Madison Avenue Bridge is a four-lane swing bridge crossing the Harlem River in New York City, connecting Madison Avenue in Manhattan with East 138th Street in the Bronx. It was designed by Alfred P. Boller and built in 1910, doubling the capacity of an earlier swing bridge built in 1884. The bridge is operated and maintained by the New York City Department of Transportation. 

For 2011, the NYCDOT reported an average daily traffic volume in both directions of 41,423; having reached a peak of 49,487 in 2002. Between 2000 and 2014, the bridge opened for vessels 69 times.

Events
The bridge is part of the course for the annual New York City Marathon. The runners cross from Manhattan to the Bronx via the Willis Avenue Bridge, follow a short course through the South Bronx, and then return to Manhattan for the race's final leg via the Madison Avenue Bridge.

Public transportation

References
Notes

External links

Madison Avenue Bridge - historic overview
NYC DoT Madison Avenue Bridge

Bridges in the Bronx
Bridges in Manhattan
Bridges completed in 1884
Bridges completed in 1910
Swing bridges in the United States
Road bridges in New York City
Bridges over the Harlem River